"Chemicals" is a 2015 single by Dutch DJs and music producers Tiësto and Don Diablo. It features vocals by Danish singer and producer Thomas Troelsen and was released on Musical Freedom and Spinnin' Records. The song was released on September 21, 2015 through Musical Freedom.

Music video
An official music video was issued on September 23, 2015. The video starts in Manhattan,New York showing a normal routine of a woman in Cheongsam, a businesswoman and a flyer man, all looking bored. Tiesto and Don Diablo transform themselves into yellow and blue trails (respectively) of chemicals and fly around the city. The trails are seen by the woman in Cheongsam, businesswoman and flyer man, all of them quit their jobs and happily follow the trails to a concert where Tiesto and Don Diablo transform back to human performing.

Track listing 
Digital Download (MF135)
 "Chemicals" - 4:26
 "Chemicals" (Radio Edit) - 3:42

2018 Translucent Purple 7" Vinyl
 "Chemicals" (Radio Edit) - 3:42
 "Chemicals" (Extended Mix) - 4:26

Charts
"Chemicals" charted in the Dutch Top 40 Tipparade chart reaching number 8. It also charted in the Belgian Ultratip chart reaching number 26 and appeared in the Swedish Sverigetopplistan reaching number 84.

Certifications

References 

2015 songs
Tiësto songs
Don Diablo songs
Songs written by Thomas Troelsen
Songs written by Tiësto
Spinnin' Records singles
Songs written by Don Diablo